Thazhekkad  is a village in Thrissur district in the state of Kerala, India.

Demographics
 India census, Thazhekkad had a population of 13387 with 6412 males and 6975 females. Thazhekkad is covering a vide area comparing to its nearby villages.

Religion
Hinduism, Christianity and Islam are the prominent religions in this area. 60% of the population are Hindus, 35% Christians and remaining 5% Islamic believers.  St. Sebastian's church located in the village is a well known pilgrimage place for people  regardless of caste or religious beliefs and social backgrounds. The deity St.Sebastian at the church is called as "Muthappan" by the residents.  Followers of all religions lead harmonious and peaceful lives. Just opposite to St.Sebastian's Church, there is a temple of Lord Siva called as Thazhekkad Maha Siva Kshethram and there have not been any communal disturbances till date. This is well recognized as the best example for the communal harmony existing in the village.

Economy
The economy of the village is based mainly on agriculture. Agricultural crops grown include paddy, coconut, arecanut, banana, spice crops like pepper, nutmeg, and fruit trees.

Thazhekkad has skilled youth who have gone to foreign lands, Middle East, Europe etc.; in search of better employment opportunities. The other significant source of income to the locality is remittances from NRIs.

Transportation
Road is the main mode of transportation for Thazhekad residents. The nearest railway station is Irinjalakuda, situated at Kallettumkara. The places/junctions connecting Thazhekkad to nearby towns and city include Kallettumkara, Kombinjamakkal, Thommana and Aloor and, these junctions and railway station are located at around 2-4 kilometers away from the village. Fast and easy to and fro commuting is an issue that the villagers face. Public transportation system, the most commonly used mode of transport by the public, is in its nascent stage over here. But gradually, many have overcome this issue to an extent by starting to use their own vehicles (bicycles, motor cycles and cars).

Geography
The landscape of this locale is attractive and naturally endowed. Evergreen paddy fields surrounded with water bodies like small canals and ponds with clear waters and aquatic richness add a perfect countryside picture to every body's heart. People from other parts of the district pay visits to Thazhekkad to enjoy holiday outings and there are a couple of interesting visitor's spots like Atbhutha Kulam (meaning 'wonder-pond'), fishing spots in paddy fields.

References

Villages in Thrissur district